Bidruyeh-ye Markazi (also Romanized as Bīdrūyeh-ye Markazī; also known as Bīdrūyeh-ye Vosţá) is a village in Hoseyniyeh Rural District, Alvar-e Garmsiri District, Andimeshk County, Khuzestan Province, Iran. At the 2006 census, its population was 1,904, in 382 families.

References 

Populated places in Andimeshk County